Illinois Route 31 (IL 31) is a  north–south state highway in northeastern Illinois, United States. It travels from U.S. Route 34 (US 34) in Oswego north to US 12, near the Wisconsin state line, just south of Richmond.

Route description

IL 31 follows the Fox River along the western bank. It parallels IL 25, which travels along the eastern bank of the Fox River. It travels concurrent with IL 120 in McHenry.

IL 31 is called Richmond Road north of IL 120 and Front Street south of IL 120 in McHenry, Main Street in Algonquin, Western Avenue in Carpentersville, Eighth Street in West Dundee, State Street in Elgin, La Fox Street in South Elgin, Second Street in St. Charles, First Street in Geneva, Batavia Avenue in Batavia, Lincolnway Street in North Aurora, Lake Street (Southbound) and River Street (Northbound) in Aurora, and Lake Street in Montgomery. It is also, along with IL 25, signed as part of the Fox River Valley area. IL 31 between Aurora and Geneva was considered part of the Lincoln Highway transcontinental route.

The Western Algonquin Bypass was completed in 2014 and redirects traffic around downtown  Algonquin.

History
SBI Route 31 traveled from Quincy to Canton along various routes. This was dropped in 1935 and was replaced with US 24. In 1937, it was reapplied along other routes on its modern routing. There have been no changes to the routing since.

U.S. Route 430

U.S. Route 430 (US 430) was commissioned from 1926 to 1935 in the U.S. state of Illinois, and traveled from Aurora to Crystal Lake. It traveled concurrently with US 30 from Aurora to Geneva at present-day IL 38. In 1934, US 430 was removed north of West Dundee after US 14 was formed. In 1935, US 430 was decommissioned after US 330 was extended north from Geneva to West Dundee. The northern extension was later removed in 1937 in favor of IL 31 and the western extension of US 330 to Dixon.

Future

McHenry
The intersection of IL 31 and IL 120 is now the most congested intersection in McHenry County.

IDOT is currently in Phase 1 of a planned widening of IL 31 from IL 176 in Crystal Lake to IL 120 in McHenry.

A bypass of McHenry continues to appear in documents planning for a Metra station at Prairie Grove, that include an interchange with the existing IL 31 alignment and the proposed west McHenry bypass alignment to the north of Gracy Road.

The west McHenry bypass was originally planned to travel over undeveloped farm lands from north of IL 31 and Gracy Road to IL 120 and Ringwood Road. The corridor was planned to be protected from development in the mid-1990s, but because of a lack of funding, the corridor was never protected from development and has since been developed.

Algonquin
The Western Algonquin Bypass is not the only limited-access bypass on the table as of 2015. A southern Algonquin bypass is being constructed as the Longmeadow Parkway, that will have a grade separation with Route 31.

Major intersections

See also

References

External links

 Illinois Highway Ends: Illinois Route 31
 Endpoints of historic U.S. Highway 430

031
Algonquin, Illinois
Elgin, Illinois
Transportation in Kendall County, Illinois
Transportation in Kane County, Illinois
Transportation in McHenry County, Illinois